In England, the Rathbone family of Liverpool were nonconformist merchants and ship-owners who were known to engage in philanthropy and public service. The family origins trace back to Gawsworth, Cheshire, where the first William Rathbone was born in 1669; it was his son, William Rathbone II, who left Gawsworth for the growing port of Liverpool, where he worked as a sawyer and most likely established a timber business. Having arrived in Liverpool prior to 1730, the family subsequently became involved in the building and ownership of ships, as well as general commerce. In 1788, William Rathbone IV leased the family house and estate of Greenbank, then part of the Toxteth Park estate, to serve as a country retreat for his young family, and purchased the freehold of Greenbank House in 1809, the year of his death.

Notable members
 William Rathbone II (1696–1746)
 William Rathbone III
 William Rathbone IV (1757–1809)
 William Rathbone V (1787–1868)
 William Rathbone VI
 Eleanor Rathbone
 Elfrida Rathbone
 Richard Rathbone
 Hugh Reynolds Rathbone
 Hannah Mary Rathbone (1798–1878)
 Basil Rathbone, actor famous for portraying Sherlock Holmes
 John Rathbone (1910–1940), Conservative MP, fighter pilot with the RAF
 Tim Rathbone (1933–2002), Conservative MP (son of above)
 Julian Rathbone (1935–2008), English novelist
 Henry Rathbone, United States military Brevet Colonel who was present at the assassination of Abraham Lincoln
 Jackson Rathbone, American actor who traces his ancestry back to the Rathbone family

References

 
English philanthropists
Businesspeople from Liverpool